Eremophila citrina is a flowering plant in the figwort family, Scrophulariaceae and is endemic to the centre of Western Australia. It is a dense, rounded shrub with yellow new growth, crowded leaves and lilac-coloured to light purple flowers.

Description
Its new leaves and stems are covered with lemon-coloured glandular hairs which gradually fade to grey. The leaves are arranged alternately along the stems and are thick and clustered, and usually have a distinct mid-vein visible on the lower surface.

The petal tube is light purple to lilac-coloured on the outside and white with light purple spots inside. It is also glabrous on the outside except for the petal lobes which are covered with hairs. The inside surfaces of the lobes are glabrous while the tube is filled with long, soft hairs.

Taxonomy and naming
The species was first formally described by Robert Chinnock in 2007 and the description was published in Eremophila and Allied Genera: A Monograph of the Plant Family Myoporaceae. The specific epithet (citrina) is a Latin word meaning "from a lemon tree" referring to the colour of the new growth of this species.

Distribution and habitat
Eremophila citrina occurs in a broad band between Newman and Laverton where it grows in stony soil derived from laterite.

Conservation status
Eremophila citrina is classified as "not threatened" by the Government of Western Australia Department of Parks and Wildlife.

Use in horticulture
This eremophila is not widely known in horticulture although it is growing well on a property in western Victoria. Its golden new growth and purple or lilac flowers are attractive features. Plants have been grown by grafting onto Myoporum. It grows best in well-drained soil in a sunny location but is sensitive to frost.

References

citrina
Eudicots of Western Australia
Plants described in 2007
Endemic flora of Western Australia